The Roman Catholic Diocese of Corner Brook and Labrador (erected 9 May 1870, as the Prefecture Apostolic of Western Newfoundland) is a suffragan of the Archdiocese of St. John's, Newfoundland. It was re-erected as an apostolic vicariate on 28 April 1892 and as the Diocese of Saint George's on 18 February 1904. The Cathedral is located in Corner Brook.

History
In 2007, the diocese was expanded and the name was changed from "St. George's" to "Corner Brook and Labrador". This was done by incorporating nearly the entirety of the Diocese of Labrador into the Diocese of St. George. The Diocese of Labrador had been predominantly cared for by the Oblates since 1847 but their mission in Labrador came to an end when Fr. Chris Rushton, the last Oblate to leave, departed in 2013.

In 2007, the Basilica of our Lady of Perpetual Help in the diocese was decreed a basilica.  The Basilica was the cathedral of the former Diocese of Labrador City–Schefferville.

Ordinaries
Thomas Sears (1871 - 1885)
Michael Francis Howley (1885 - 1895), appointed Bishop of Saint John’s, Newfoundland
Neil McNeil (1895 - 1910), appointed Archbishop of Vancouver, British Columbia
Michael Fintan Power (1911 - 1920)
Henry Thomas Renouf (1920 - 1941)
Michael O'Reilly (1941 - 1970)
Richard Thomas McGrath (1970 - 1985)
Raymond John Lahey (1986 - 2003), appointed Bishop of Antigonish, Nova Scotia
David Douglas Crosby, O.M.I. (2003 - September 2010), appointed Bishop of Hamilton
Peter Joseph Hundt (1 March 2011 - Dec 12, 2018); had been an Auxiliary Bishop of the Roman Catholic Archdiocese of Toronto, Ontario; appointed Archbishop of Saint John’s, Newfoundland
Bart van Roijen (12 December 2019-) At the time of his appointment he was serving as Vicar General of the Diocese of Nelson.

See also
 Doe v Bennett

References

Bibliography

External links
Corner Brook and Labrador Diocese, Newfoundland official site
Constitutio Apostolica Riviangulanensis-Labradorensis Apostolic Constitution creating the diocese

 
Corner Brook and Labrador
Corner Brook and Labrador
Corner Brook and Labrador
Organizations based in Newfoundland and Labrador
Corner Brook